Tibor Selymes (born 14 May 1970) is a Romanian former football player and current manager of Liga III club Știința Miroslava.

Playing career 
Born in Bălan of Hungarian descent, Selymes made his debut in Divizia A with FC Brașov in 1988. He later played many years in Belgium.

Selymes got 46 caps for the national team between 1992 and 1999, and was in the squad for the 1994 World Cup, Euro 1996 and the 1998 World Cup.

Managerial career 
In September 2010 he was appointed as manager of Astra Ploiești. He was sacked in August 2011, after only two games from the 2011–12 season, both lost by Astra. He then took control of FCM Târgu Mureș, but stayed there for only three games, resigning after one draw and two defeats. He returned to Astra in November 2011. On 16 December 2011, he was fired from Astra, the second time this season.

On 2 April 2013, Selymes returned to Dinamo, after 20 years. He signed a contract for two months to manage the second team of the club.

On 17 June 2013, he signed Săgeata Năvodari that will make its Liga I debut. On 6 January 2014, Selymes was appointed as the manager of the Hungarian League club Kaposvári Rákóczi FC. The club was relegated at the end of the 2013–14 season, and Selymes left.

In September 2014, he signed a contract with former Romanian champions Oțelul Galați. He resigned in March 2015. In June 2015, he was named the new manager of Petrolul Ploiești.

Personal life 
Tibor is the nephew of Nicolae Selymes, who was also an international footballer who played for Dinamo București and FC Brașov in the 1960s. In 2010 Selymes attempted to launch his own airline but ultimately failed when he did not pass the sufficient qualifications to fly an aeroplane.

Honours

Club
Dinamo București
Romanian League: 1991–92

Anderlecht
Belgian League: 1999–2000

Managerial statistics

References

External links
 
 

1970 births
Living people
People from Bălan
Romanian sportspeople of Hungarian descent
Romanian footballers
Association football defenders
Romania international footballers
1994 FIFA World Cup players
1998 FIFA World Cup players
UEFA Euro 1996 players
Liga I players
FC Brașov (1936) players
FC Dinamo București players
Belgian Pro League players
Cercle Brugge K.S.V. players
R.S.C. Anderlecht players
Standard Liège players
Nemzeti Bajnokság I players
Szombathelyi Haladás footballers
Cypriot First Division players
Debreceni VSC players
AEL Limassol players
Romanian expatriate footballers
Romanian expatriate sportspeople in Belgium
Expatriate footballers in Belgium
Romanian expatriate sportspeople in Cyprus
Expatriate footballers in Cyprus
Romanian expatriate sportspeople in Hungary
Expatriate footballers in Hungary
Romanian football managers
FC Sopron managers
FC Sportul Studențesc București managers
FC Astra Giurgiu managers
ASA 2013 Târgu Mureș managers
AFC Săgeata Năvodari managers
ASC Oțelul Galați managers
FC Petrolul Ploiești managers
FC Olimpia Satu Mare managers
CS Știința Miroslava managers
Nemzeti Bajnokság I managers